Kiyanu Kim is a Korean-American songwriter, musician and producer. He was born in Seoul, Korea, on January 19, 1973.  He currently resides in New York.

He is best known for co-writing the Miley Cyrus hit "Wrecking Ball", providing Cyrus with the initial kernel of the song which was later developed by others.

Kim has worked with Gwen Stefani, Linda Perry, Lamont Dozier, Ben Jelen and Gala with songs he has produced/written being used in over thirty television shows.

Kim served as a panelist in May 2015 at the Montauk Music Festival in Montauk, New York. The industry-focused panel discussed the issues faced by performing musicians.

Works

References

American male songwriters
Living people
1973 births